Amir Kashmiri (born 2 February 1991) is a Pakistani-born actor and Film Editor who appears in Pakistani films. He made his film debut in 2011 with Shoaib Mansoor's Bol for which he won a London Asian Film Festival award.

Early life 

Amr was born  in Lahore, Pakistan. He is the son of Pakistani educators Saleem A. Kashmiri (former head master of Aitchison College and Dr. Nosheena Saleem (former principal of College of Home Economics, Lahore).He is currently teaching in TNS Beaconhouse.

Career 

Kashmiri is a well-known musician and a theater actor. He got a call from Shoaib Mansoor and was selected for the role of Saifi opposite Humaima Malick, Iman Ali, Mahira Khan and Atif Aslam. He won London Asian Film Festival and British Academy Film Awards for Bol..

Filmography

Awards

References

Pakistani Muslims
1991 births
Living people
People from Lahore
Pakistani male child actors
Pakistani male film actors
Male actors from Lahore